is a Japanese professional footballer who plays as an attacking midfielder or a winger for Japanese club Cerezo Osaka and the Japan national team. He played for Japan at the 2012 Summer Olympics.

Club career
In the summer of 2012, Kiyotake signed a four-year contract with German club 1. FC Nürnberg. Kiyotake subsequently moved within the Bundesliga in 2014 to join Hannover 96, before transferring to join Spanish side Sevilla in La Liga following Hannover 96's relegation from the Bundesliga.

Personal life
His younger brother, Koki, is also a professional football player.

Career statistics

Club

International

Scores and results list Japan's goal tally first, score column indicates score after each Kiyotake goal.

Honours
Oita Trinita
J.League Cup: 2008

Cerezo Osaka
J.League Cup: 2017
Emperor's Cup: 2017
Japanese Super Cup: 2018

References

External links
 
 
 
 Profile at Cerezo Osaka
 Hiroshi Kiyotake at 1. FC Nürnberg
 

1989 births
Living people
Association football people from Ōita Prefecture
Japanese footballers
Association football midfielders
Japan international footballers
J1 League players
Bundesliga players
La Liga players
Oita Trinita players
Cerezo Osaka players
1. FC Nürnberg players
Hannover 96 players
Sevilla FC players
Olympic footballers of Japan
Footballers at the 2012 Summer Olympics
2013 FIFA Confederations Cup players
2014 FIFA World Cup players
2015 AFC Asian Cup players
Japanese expatriate footballers
Japanese expatriate sportspeople in Germany
Japanese expatriate sportspeople in Spain
Expatriate footballers in Germany
Expatriate footballers in Spain